The Chrysler LeBaron, also known as the Imperial LeBaron, is a line of automobiles built by Chrysler from 1931-1941 and from 1955-1995. The model was introduced in 1931, with a body manufactured by LeBaron, and competed with other luxury cars of the era such as Lincoln and Packard. After purchasing LeBaron with its parent Briggs Manufacturing Company, Chrysler introduced the luxury make Imperial in 1955, and sold automobiles under the name Imperial LeBaron until 1975. Chrysler discontinued the Imperial brand in 1975, and reintroduced the Chrysler LeBaron in 1977 to what was then Chrysler's lowest priced model. 

The "LeBaron" name has since been applied to five different cars built by the Chrysler Division:
 1977–1981 M-body Mid-size LeBaron sedan, coupe, and wagon
 1982–1988 K-body Mid-size LeBaron sedan, coupe, convertible, and wagon
 1985–1989 H-body Mid-size LeBaron GTS hatchback
 1987–1995 J-body Personal luxury LeBaron coupe and convertible
 1990–1994 AA-body Mid-size LeBaron sedan
The last Chrysler LeBaron was produced in 1995, to be replaced with the Cirrus and Sebring. The LeBaron was one of Chrysler's longest running brands.

The LeBaron background 

LeBaron was one of the many prominent coachbuilders in the 1920s and 1930s to provide bodies for luxury cars. It was founded in Bridgeport, Connecticut in 1920 by Thomas L. Hibbard and Raymond H. Dietrich. It was later purchased by Briggs Manufacturing Company of Detroit in 1926, the major manufacturer of bodies for Ford, Chrysler, Hudson, Packard and others, and operated as a Briggs specialist subsidiary.

LeBaron supplied exquisite custom bodies for various car companies such as Chrysler's luxury Imperial line, Duesenberg, and Cadillac.
LeBaron's last projects for Chrysler were the Chrysler Newport Phaeton, a super-streamlined dual cowl phaeton with an aluminum body and the remarkable 1941 Chrysler Thunderbolt, a sleek roadster with concealed headlights (like the 1936 Cord 810/812) and a retractable metal hardtop styled by Alex Tremulis, who would later style the legendary Tucker of 1948.

Chrysler purchased Briggs Manufacturing Company in 1953.
Two years after the Chrysler Corporation introduced the Imperial as a separate luxury division, LeBaron was designated the top-of-the-line Imperial models in 1957 through 1975.

Classic generation (1931–1941)

The LeBarons started in the 1930s during the automobile's Classic era and competed directly with the luxury brands of its day such as Lincoln, Cadillac, and Packard. In the mid-1930s, Chrysler added a radical new "Art Deco" design shape, known as the Airflow Imperials, to the Chrysler line. The high-end CW series were supplied by LeBaron. The design features were considered advanced and perhaps ahead of their time. However, the shape was too radical for buyer's tastes and non-Airflow models outsold Airflows by about 3 to 1. Raymond Dietrich, co-founder and former stylist at LeBaron, was hired in 1932 to be Chrysler's in-house stylist. Dietrich restyled the Airflow line and Chryslers moved to more mainstream styles. As a result of the poor Airflow sales, Chrysler design actually became quite conservative for the next two decades. Auto manufacturers continued to build up their in-house styling departments and bodyworks, with the result that LeBaron became less important to most of its customers for design ideas and bodies. Toward the late 1930s, LeBaron/Briggs built more bodies for Chrysler and fewer bodies for Ford. Chrysler became their biggest customer, with additional bodies built for Packard, Hudson, and Graham-Paige. During the late 1930s and early 1940s, the LeBaron name and division became less important for Briggs, although it remained a division of Briggs until the Chrysler buy-out in 1953.

LeBaron's last projects for Chrysler were two concept cars: the Chrysler Newport Phaeton, a super-streamlined dual cowl phaeton with an aluminum body and the remarkable 1941 Chrysler Thunderbolt, a sleek roadster with concealed headlights and a retractable metal hardtop styled by Alex Tremulis, who went on to later style part of the legendary Tucker of 1948. Only 6 of each were made.

Imperial generation (1955–1975)
The Chrysler Corporation spun off the Imperial as a separate luxury make and division in 1955. LeBaron was designated the top-of-the-line Imperial models from 1956 through 1975. These cars were Imperials and did not include the "Chrysler" nameplate. Vehicles branded "LeBaron" were the top model of the Imperial line, followed by the mid-line "Crown" and a short-lived nameless base model ("Custom" from 1960 until 1963); with "Southampton" being a sub-designation applied to all pillarless hardtops.

The Imperial LeBarons were made to compete directly with competitor's luxury brands that included Continental, Cadillac, and Packard, as was the case during the 1930s.

The last Imperial model was assembled in June 1975, the discontinuation due to dwindling sales.

First generation (1977–1981)

Although the LeBaron model name had been used before on Imperials, this was the first time the name was used as a Chrysler model. Introduced in spring 1977 as a late 1977 model in response to the Cadillac Seville and Lincoln Versailles, the cars used the Dodge Aspen platform (F-body), but with a different body shell known as the M-body, and their primary purpose was as a luxury version of the Aspen/Volaré. The initial 1977 models comprised coupes and sedans, with a Town & Country station wagon appearing for 1978 (using the nameplate formerly carried by full-sized C-body Chrysler wagons). The sedans and wagons, though considered M-bodies, were nearly identical to F-body Aspens and Volarés except for the hoods, trunk lids, and front and rear header panels.

The coupes differed more substantially; where the F-body models utilized a 108.7 inch wheelbase coupe, M-bodies (which included the Dodge Diplomat) used a unique coupe with styling evocative of the 1930s on the same 112.7 inch wheelbase as the sedans and wagons. Engines consisted of the 225-cid Slant Six, the 318 V8, and the 360 V8. Most were equipped with the 3-speed Torqueflite automatic transmission, but a four-speed manual gearbox with an overdrive fourth gear was offered with the two smaller engines until 1981.

In 1979, the LeBaron was reskinned for the 1980 model year to gain more crisp sheet metal, gaining a waterfall grille which was an Imperial LeBaron feature that appeared in 1974, new headlight fascias, and more angular taillamps. The rear roofline was also made shorter and steeper. The 2-door coupe received new smooth rear sheetmetal, that replaced the old curved rear panels, and was moved to the 108.7 inch wheelbase. On the inside, enhancements were made to the interior to make it more luxurious. Also that year, a limited edition "Fifth Avenue" package was available on the 4-door sedan with an altered roofline and additional content; only 654 LeBarons were produced with this package, all converted by the American Sunroof Corporation.

A police package was offered for 1981, after the demise of the Volaré, which was replaced by a new M-body Plymouth Gran Fury for 1982, keeping Chrysler-Plymouth dealers in the competition for law enforcement contracts.

The LeBaron model name was moved to the new front-wheel drive K-platform for the 1982 model year. The former M-body LeBaron sedan became the Chrysler New Yorker and could still be equipped with the Fifth Avenue package. The M-body wagons and coupes were discontinued after 1981. Chrysler's M-body sedan was ultimately renamed New Yorker Fifth Avenue for 1983 and then just Fifth Avenue starting in 1984. M-body Fifth Avenue production continued through 1989 little changed from the 1980-vintage LeBaron sedan.

Production Figures: 

(For 1979 and 1981, coupe and sedan production figures are not separated)

Second generation (1982–1988)

For 1982, the LeBaron moved to the front-wheel drive Chrysler K platform, where it was the upscale brand's lowest priced offering. It was initially available in just sedan and coupe versions. In early 1982, it was released in a convertible version, bringing to the market the first factory-built open-topped domestic vehicle since the 1976 Cadillac Eldorado.

A station wagon version called the Town and Country was added as well. A special Town and Country convertible was also made from 1983 until 1986 with a 1,105 total produced, which like the wagon featured simulated wood paneling that made it resemble the original 1940s Town and Country. This model was part of the well-equipped Mark Cross option package for the latter years. 

Despite being mechanically similar to the Aries and Reliant, its fascias closely resembled those of the larger E-body sedans. This generation featured Chrysler's Electronic Voice Alert, a computerized voice which warned drivers about various conditions with phrases such as "A door is ajar" or "Your engine oil pressure is low".

The LeBaron was facelifted for 1986 receiving rounder front and rear ends to improve aerodynamics. The sedan's full vinyl roof was replaced by a landau padded top. The instrumentation cluster was revised from a rectangle speedometer and fuel gauge with a message center to round gauges similar to the Reliant/Aries but with a argent surround for a more upscale appearance. Coupes and convertibles were dropped for 1987, being replaced by the all-new J-body LeBaron released that year. The sedan and wagon continued with minor change until 1988. A new digital dashboard replaced the analog gauges for a more modern appearance. A larger LeBaron sedan based on the Dodge Spirit and Plymouth Acclaim would arrive for the 1990 model year.

1985–1989 LeBaron GTS

The 1985 LeBaron GTS was a somewhat different car than the standard LeBaron and was based on the Chrysler H platform. It was available at the same time as the Cadillac Cimarron as a luxury-brand model, while offering a similar level of equipment to the small Cadillac. As a 5-door hatchback still derived from the K-car, the GTS (and the similar Dodge Lancer) was more of a performance vehicle than the softer-tuned K-car LeBaron sedan. In base configuration, the car was powered by Chrysler's 2.2 liter inline-4 engine, later replaced by a 2.5 L TBI version generating . A turbocharged 2.2 L engine producing  was also available. The GTS moniker was dropped for 1989, the final year of this vehicle's production, after the K-based LeBaron sedan was discontinued after 1988.

Trim levels
 High Line - 1985–1989
 Premium - 1985–1988
 GTS - 1989 (replaced "Premium" after the "GTS" was dropped from the name of the car)
 "Pacifica" 1986 (replaced by Shelby Lancer in 1987) Limited 500 run
Production Figures:

European market - the Chrysler GTS
After some years of absence, Chrysler officially started offering some models under its own brand on the European market from April 1988 on. One of them was the "Chrysler GTS", which in fact was a rebadged version of the Dodge Lancer ES. Sales figures were moderate.

 Third generation coupe/convertible (1987–1995) 

After discontinuing the first generation LeBaron coupe and convertible in 1986, Chrysler released a new LeBaron for 1987, built on the J platform (a K platform derivative) and available as a coupe or convertible. The all-new LeBaron looked modern and aerodynamic compared to its boxy predecessor and was quite stylish for its day, featuring headlights hidden behind retractable metal covers and a waterfall grille, steeply raked windshield, full-width taillight lenses though only the edges actually lit up, and curved (Coke bottle) style rocker panels. The LeBaron was equipped with a trip & fuel economy computer and full instrumentation. In Mexico, these models were marketed as the Chrysler Phantom. The available engines were the stock 2.2-liter and 2.5-liter, naturally aspirated or turbocharged, and for the 1990 model year, a 3.0-liter Mitsubishi V6 became available, although the Mexican Chrysler Phantom R/T DOHC 16V also offered the same 2.2-liter turbo engine as used in the U.S. market Dodge Spirit R/T.

For 1990, the LeBaron's interior was refreshed, featuring an all new dashboard, gauge cluster, door panels, and center console design. All of the new components were designed to be smoother and more flowing than the comparatively boxy 1987-89 interior style, making it more in tune with the "aero" revolution of the early 1990s. The 1992 LeBaron coupes and convertibles could be ordered with a new "sport package", which featured a monochrome appearance including body-colored grille, accent stripe, and decklid logo. The package also included 14-inch "lace" style wheelcovers and a black strip below the taillights in place of chrome, with special blacked-out window moldings on coupe models.

1993 Facelift

In 1992 for the 1993 model year, the LeBaron received a slight facelift. The hidden headlamps of the 1987-1992 models were deleted in favor of less costly flush-mounted replaceable-bulb headlamps, new wheel styles were made available, and all models got the amber rear turn signals introduced on the deluxe 1992 models. For 1994, a passenger side airbag became standard on all models. Also new for 1994 was the "Bright LX" decor package which included a "bright" chrome grille, "bright" chrome badging, and "bright" chrome molding inserts, as opposed to being body-colored on the GTC. 

The turbocharged engines were dropped from the lineup in 1992 for the 1993 model year. The coupe was discontinued after 1993. In 1994 the 3.0 was the only available engine. The convertible was discontinued after 1995, to make way for the new Chrysler Sebring coupes and convertibles, for 1995 and 1996 respectively.

Trim levels: 1987–1995

Throughout its lifetime, the LeBaron convertible/coupe was available in many trim levels. For its first year, the LeBaron was available in Highline and Premium, typical Chrysler trims at the time. The number of trims grew, peaking in 1990, with six available. After that, the number decreased until just two trim levels remained for 1995.

 1987: Highline, Premium
 1988: Highline, Premium, GT
 1989: GTS Turbo, GT Turbo, GTC Turbo, Highline, Premium
 1990: GT, GT Turbo, GTC Turbo, Highline, Highline Turbo, Premium
 1991: GTC, GTC Turbo, Highline, Highline Turbo, Premium LX
 1992: GTC, GTC Turbo, Highline, Highline Turbo, LX
 1993: GTC, Highline, LX
 1994: GTC, LX
 1995: GTC, LX

Racing
Several ARCA (one tier down from NASCAR cup racing) teams built LeBaron based race cars (supported by a revitalized Chrysler Direct Connection performance parts division) and ran them from 1988 until 1998. 

Production Figures:

Third generation sedan (1990–1994)

The last LeBaron sedan was built on the front wheel drive AA platform, another K derivative, as junior level sedan to the more upscale New Yorker. It offered rebadged versions under the Dodge Spirit and Plymouth Acclaim nameplates, and the three differed mostly in detail and trim choices, as well as the European Chrysler Saratoga. 

Theoretically, as historically was the case in this era whenever Chrysler, Dodge, and Plymouth shared direct model variants, the Acclaim was supposed to be the more mainstream version, while the Spirit was the sportier version, and the LeBaron was the luxury version, reflecting the Chrysler brand's flagship status. In reality, however, there was considerable overlap amongst the three in available trim, equipment and features. The top-line LeBaron Landau model offered a padded vinyl half-roof with smaller "formal" backlight. All LeBaron sedans came with a standard driver's side airbag, and could seat up to six passengers.

For 1992, the LeBaron sedan was split into three trim levels: base, LX and Landau. The new entry model eliminated the previously standard V6 engine and landau vinyl roof while the Landau model still included the landau roof as standard.  The LX, available one year only, offered standard V6 but no landau roof. For 1993, the LeBaron sedan received new rear lights, which incorporated the reversing lamps previously located in the bumper fascia and the lineup was reduced to two trim levels with the entry model now labeled LE. The LeBaron sedan was discontinued on May 18, 1994 while the Dodge Spirit and Plymouth Acclaim continued production until December 21, 1994. The Chrysler LeBaron was replaced by the "Cloud Car" Chrysler Cirrus.

Safety
In 1994, the U.S. National Highway Traffic Safety Administration rated the LeBaron a 4 out of 5 for driver side and a 3 out of 5 for passenger side frontal impact occupant protection.

Trim levels
 base - 1990–1992
 LX - 1992
 Landau - 1992–1994
 LE'' - 1993–1994
Production Figures:

Mexican market
M and K-platform cars were assembled in the Toluca, Mexico facility. The M-platform LeBaron was sold in Mexico from the 1977 to the 1982 model years. The K-car LeBaron was also produced in Toluca and was sold for the 1983 through 1987 model years. There were no K-platform convertibles offered from the factory.

Chrysler Phantom was the Mexican-market version of the J-Body LeBaron Coupe. There were no convertibles of the J-body 2-door for the Mexican market. Phantoms were Chrysler's top-of-the-line model in Mexico and generally sold with a higher trim level than their United States counterparts; the Phantom was also only ever available with the more powerful, turbocharged engines. Chrysler Phantoms were marketed from 1987 until 1994, with the first cars delivered in December 1986. A more powerful R/T version (similar to the American LeBaron GTC but using a higher-tuned turbo engine) was also available in 1992 and 1993. The Phantom R/T originally received the 2.5-liter  Turbo II engine, coupled to a three-speed automatic, but this was quickly changed to the  Turbo III engine with a five-speed Getrag manual transmission.

The Mexican AA-body Chrysler LeBaron 4-door sedan was called the New Yorker (all of them with Landau roof), and the "K" body (slightly shorter) was reserved for the 4-door LeBaron's, which were sold in two trim levels, one with Landau roof and leather, and the other one without those two options.

References

Sources
 Coachbuilt: LeBaron Carrossiers - 1920-1925, LeBaron Inc. - 1925-1928, LeBaron-Detroit - 1928-1942
 Coachbuilt: Briggs Manufacturing Co. - 1909-1954
 Conceptcarz: Chrysler LeBaron news
 Allpar: LeBaron Coupe
 Consumer Guide: 1990-1995 LeBaron coupe/convertible reviews
 Consumer Guide: 1990-1994 LeBaron Sedan reviews
 Front-Runners.net - LeBaron Road Test (PDF)

External links

 Chrysler LeBaron History
 Chrysler Le Baron GTC
 MyLebaron
 LeBaron.de - German Forum, Gallery, KnowHow...
 Chrysler K-car Club

LeBaron
Mid-size cars
Rear-wheel-drive vehicles
Coupés
Hatchbacks
Sedans
1980s cars
1990s cars
Cars introduced in 1977
Front-wheel-drive sports cars